The Niko Dovana Stadium, officially Stadiumi "Niko Dovana", is a multi-use stadium located in Durrës, Albania. It is the home ground of Teuta. The capacity is 12,040, making it the fifth largest ground in the country. It was renamed in 1991 in honour of former Teuta goalkeeper and financier Niko Dovana.

The Albania national football team played in the Niko Dovana Stadium for the first time in a friendly international match against Uzbekistan on 11 August 2010.

The stadium has also been used as a shelter in the aftermath of the 2019 Albania earthquake.

International matches
The Niko Dovana Stadium has hosted 2 friendly matches of the Albania national football team.

References

Niko Dovana
Sport in Durrës
Buildings and structures in Durrës
KF Teuta Durrës
Sports venues completed in 1965
1965 establishments in Albania
List of football stadiums in Albania